The 1980 Finnish motorcycle Grand Prix was the seventh round of the 1980 Grand Prix motorcycle racing season. It took place on the weekend of 25-27 July 1980 at the Imatra Circuit.

Classification

500 cc

References

Finnish motorcycle Grand Prix
Motorcycle Grand Prix
Finnish